Multiplicative partitions of factorials are expressions of values of the factorial function as products of powers of prime numbers. They have been studied by Paul Erdős and others.

The factorial of a positive integer is a product of decreasing integer factors, which can in turn be factored into prime numbers. This means that any factorial can be written as a product of powers of primes.

1, 1, 3, 3, 10, 10, 30, 75, 220, 220, 588, 588, 1568, 3696, 11616, ... .
Not all sorted multiplicative partitions of a given factorial have the same length. For example, the partitions of  have lengths 4, 3 and 5. In other words, exactly one of the partitions of  has length 5.
2, 2, 5, 12, 31, 31, 78, 78, 191, 418, 1220, 1220, 3015, ... .
Consider all sorted multiplicative partitions of  that have length , and find the partition whose first factor is the largest. (Since the first factor in a partition is the smallest within that partition, this means finding the maximum of all the minima.) Call this factor .
2, 2, 2, 3, 3, 3, 3, 3, 3, 4, 4, 4, 4, 4, 5, 5, 5, 5, 5, 5, 5, 5, 7, 7, 7, 7, 7, 7, ... .
The decimal representation of the Alladi–Grinstead constant begins,

0.80939402054063913071793188059409131721595399242500030424202871504... .The exact value of the constant can be written as the exponential of a certain infinite series. Explicitly,where  is given byThis sum can alternatively be expressed as follows, writing  for the Riemann zeta function:This series for the constant  converges more rapidly than the one before. Erdős raised the question of how large the gaps in the sequence of  can grow, and how long the constant stretches can be.

References 

Factorial and binomial topics